Ace of Spades: Bad Destiny is a 2012 Montenegrin drama film directed by Draško Đurović. The film was selected as the Montenegrin entry for the Best Foreign Language Film at the 86th Academy Awards, It was the first time Montenegro submitted a film for the Best Foreign Language Oscar, but it was not nominated.

Plot 
The film is set in the 1990s. To a small town in Montenegro returns Beli, who during the war in Yugoslavia belonged to the paramilitary formation Shadows (Sjenke), which took part in the execution of civilians. His younger brother Kent earns a living keeping company with the wives of wealthy businessmen. Kent's life changes when he meets Sanja, a refugee from Sarajevo. Former Shadow soldiers also arrive in the city. They are looking for Beli, who has videos showing executions carried out during the war.

Cast
 Predrag Bjelac
 Danilo Celebic
 Rastko Jankovic
 Vojislav Krivokapic
 Michael Madsen
 Milica Milsa
 Miro Nikolic
 Momcilo Otasevic
 Marta Picuric
 Momo Picuric
 Branimir Popovic
 Jelena Simic
 Branka Stanic
 Slavko Klikovac

See also
 List of submissions to the 86th Academy Awards for Best Foreign Language Film
 List of Montenegrin submissions for the Academy Award for Best Foreign Language Film

References

External links
 
 

2012 films
2012 drama films
Montenegrin drama films
Films set in Montenegro
Serbo-Croatian-language films